La Libertad, officially the Municipality of La Libertad (Subanen: Benwa La Libertad; Chavacano: Municipalidad de La Libertad), is a 5th class municipality in the province of Zamboanga del Norte, Philippines. According to the 2020 census, it has a population of 8,119 people.

Geography

Barangays
La Libertad is politically subdivided into 13 barangays.
 El Paraiso
 La Union
 La Victoria
 Mauswagon
 Mercedes
 New Argao
 New Bataan
 New Carcar
 Poblacion
 San Jose
 Santa Catalina
 Santa Cruz
 Singaran

Climate

Demographics

Economy

References

External links
 La Libertad Profile at PhilAtlas.com
 [ Philippine Standard Geographic Code]
Philippine Census Information

Municipalities of Zamboanga del Norte